Francis Llacer (born 9 September 1971 in Lagny-sur-Marne) is a French former professional footballer who played as a defender.

During a 14-year professional career, Llacer played mainly for Paris Saint-Germain, and retired in 2003.

Honours
Paris Saint-Germain
 Ligue 1: 1993–94
 Coupe de la Ligue: 1994–95
 Coupe de France: 1994–95
 UEFA Cup Winners' Cup: 1995–96

References

External links
 
 

1971 births
Living people
People from Lagny-sur-Marne
Footballers from Seine-et-Marne
Association football defenders
French footballers
France under-21 international footballers
CS Meaux players
Paris Saint-Germain F.C. players
RC Strasbourg Alsace players
AS Saint-Étienne players
Montpellier HSC players
Ligue 1 players
Competitors at the 1993 Mediterranean Games
Mediterranean Games bronze medalists for France
Mediterranean Games medalists in football